Child labour in Iraq has risen due to poverty, violence and force displacement. Based on a 2016 report by the United Nations Children’s Fund (UNICEF) more than half a million children are working due to decline of family incomes, violence and displacement. The report indicates that the number of children working at the time of the report had increased more than 575,000 since 1990.

ISIS war
Between 2014,when ISIS took control of large areas in northern and western Iraq, and 2016 almost 10 per cent of Iraqi children (more than 1.5 million) fled their homes because of violence. As a result, 20 per cent of schools were shut down leaving 3.5 million children unable to go to school.

Displacement
Another UNICEF report states that “As of mid-2016, 3.4 million Iraqis - almost 10% of the population - are now displaced, and millions more are in need of urgent humanitarian assistance. This massive internal displacement, as well as conflict-related economic decline, have put enormous strain on the host communities and strained social systems. Many parties to the conflict are engaged in gross human rights abuses and the number of grave violations against children has doubled over the past 12 months—girls who are captured face gender based violence and boys are recruited to fight or work on the front lines.” 
The Iraqi observatory for Human Rights (IOHR) has documented many cases of child labour, particularly displaced children. The report emphasis the displaced children were forced to work to fulfill the basic needs of their families, but at the same time the employers had exploited the children by paying them very little, and their urgent need for work.

Iraq’s labour law
Article 6, chapter 3 of Iraqi Labour Law, states that the minimum age for employment is 15 years old. According to 1989 International Convention on the Rights of the Child, everyone under the age of 18 is considered a child who must have special protection and care.

References 

Iraq